St John's College is a school in Panadura, Sri Lanka, that was founded in 1876. It is a National school with a student population of 3500 and staff of about 150

History
St. John's College was initially known as 'Primary State English School' which had existed from about the middle of the 19th century. In 1876 it received endowments from Wasala Mudliyar Susew de Soysa (1809–1881) as well as Sir Charles Henry de Soysa and was named 'St. John's College' by the Anglican Bishop of Colombo, Reginald Stephen Copleston. It was ceremonially opened by the Governor William Henry Gregory on 14 June 1876 (along with the Prince of Wales' College, Moratuwa).

In 1882, the headmaster, Cyril Arnold Jansz, was appointed as the first principal by the Bishop of Colombo of the Anglican church, at the request of the people of Panadura and has rendered an immense service for the upliftment of the school. Starting with 75 students the numbers raised gradually and in 1885 classes for girls began at St John's started by Mrs Jansz. The school celebrated the 125th anniversary during the year 2000.

Battle of Greens 
The annual big match is played between St. John's College and Panadura Royal College. It is known as the Battle of the Greens .

Notable alumni

The alumni of St. John's College are known as Old Johnians. Alumni include:

References

External links
St. John's College Official Web Site
Read this article in Sinhala
Map in St. John's College 
 
 
 

1876 establishments in Ceylon
Educational institutions established in 1876
Schools in Panadura